Park Top (May 1964 – 1989) was a top-class British racehorse. She had an unfashionable pedigree, cost only 500 guineas as a yearling and did not run as a two-year-old. Her Grand-dam Oola Hills was the dam of Pappa Fourway, but unlike him, Park Top was at her best over middle distances.

Her career tally was 13 races worth £136,440. She was disappointing as a broodmare and her few foals had shown minimal talent before she was retired in 1979. Park Top was bred by Joan Scott of Buttermilk Stud Farm, South Newington, Oxfordshire.

Racing career

1966: two-year-old season
Being a late foal she was backward as a two-year-old and also suffered from problems with her fetlock joints and later developed a cough.
All of these were factors in the decision not to run Park Top as a two-year-old.

1967: three-year-old season
She began her career with an easy win in the Mar Lodge Place (for 3-y-o maidens) at Windsor.
A second easy win, in the Twyford Stakes (3-y-o fillies) at Newbury, encouraged her owner to aim higher by tackling the Ribblesdale Stakes at Royal Ascot.  Starting second favourite she won smoothly, defeating St Pauli Girl who had earlier finished second in The Oaks.
Six weeks later she won the Brighton Cup (then a good handicap).

1968: four-year-old season
Won the Brighton Challenge Cup again, and also took the Prix d'Hédouville at Longchamp.

1969: five-year-old season
It was as a five-year-old that she really shone. That year she was largely ridden by Lester Piggott but he was unable to ride her in the Hardwicke Stakes and Geoff Lewis took over for that race and the Eclipse Stakes. A victory at Longchamp in May was followed by a success in the Coronation Cup, Hardwicke Stakes and King George VI and Queen Elizabeth Stakes. She was beaten in the Eclipse Stakes by Wolver Hollow when her rider Geoff Lewis pulled her off the rail allowing Piggott on Wolver Hollow to nip up the rail and go clear. When Park Top was extricated from a pocket she ran on strongly but was unable to reel in the winner. Piggott was reinstated as her rider when she easily won the King George at Ascot later in July 1969. In the Prix de l'Arc de Triomphe she was stuck behind a wall of horses and finished fast to be second behind Levmoss. Piggott blamed himself for her defeat but her owner the Duke of  Devonshire was more forgiving in the book he wrote about Park Top A Romance of the Turf.

1970: six-year-old season
After a warm up win at Longchamp in May, Park Top was beaten into second when trying to win the Coronation Cup at Epsom for the second time.
Jarred up by the firm ground at Epsom she did not race again until the Cumberland Lodge stakes at Ascot in September.  She won well, but finished lame.
Appearing to have made a full recovery from what was only temporary lameness, she returned to Longchamp, for a seventh time, to bid farewell.  Sadly she was well below her best and could only finish third. Park Top was retired from breeding in 1980 and died in 1989.

See also

 Pappa Fourway

References

 A Romance of the Turf – written by Andrew Robert Buxton Cavendish
 The Complete Encyclopedia of Horse Racing – written by Bill Mooney and George Ennor
 Park Top's pedigree and racing stats

1964 racehorse births
1989 racehorse deaths
Racehorses bred in the United Kingdom
Racehorses trained in the United Kingdom
Thoroughbred family 26
King George VI and Queen Elizabeth Stakes winners